The Westfield State Owls football program is a college football team that represents Westfield State University in the New England Football Conference, a part of the Division III (NCAA).  The team has had 18 head coaches since its first recorded football game in 1980. The current coach is Pete Kowalski .

Key

Coaches
Statistics correct as of the end of the 2022 college football season.

Notes

References

Lists of college football head coaches

Massachusetts sports-related lists